The Dominion Day Stakes is a Thoroughbred horse race run annually in July at Woodbine Racetrack in Toronto, Ontario, Canada.  A Grade III event currently offering a purse of CAD$150,000 +, it is open to horses aged three years and up. The race was run at a distance of  miles from its inception until 1983 when it was changed to its present  miles format. It was raced on dirt until 2007 when a polytrack surface was installed. In 2016, the surface was changed to Tapeta  synthetic turf.

Inaugurated in 1953 at the Old Woodbine Racetrack, it remained there until the track closed in 1955.

The race celebrates Dominion Day, the birth of the Canadian Confederation on July 1, 1867.

Ace Marine, one of Canada's greatest runners, and its 1955 Horse of the Year, won this race in 1956.  In 1972, Canada's 1973 Horse of the Year, Kennedy Road, took the Dominion.  The Canadian Champion Three-Year-Old colt of 1972, Nice Dancer, won it in 1973.  The 1980 Canadian Horse of the Year as well as the 1980 Champion Older Female in Canada & the USA, plus the 1981 Champion Older Female in Canada, Glorious Song, won it twice—in 1980 & 1981. In 1984, the 1984 Canadian Champion Three-Year-Old colt, Key to the Moon, won the Dominion, and in 1990, Charlie Barley (by the U.S. Triple Crown winner Affirmed) who was the 1989 Champion Grass horse in Canada, came home the winner. 1996 Canadian Horse of the Year, Mt. Sassafras has also won the Dominion Day Stakes twice: 1996 & 1999.

Among other past winners, the 1963 and 2006 editions of the Dominion Day Stakes were won by Kentucky Derby winners, Decidedly and Funny Cide respectively.

Records
Time record: (at current  miles distance)
 2:01.15 - Phantom Light (2003)

Most wins:
 2 - Bye and Near (1968, 1969)
 2 - Glorious Song (1980, 1981)
 2 - Mt. Sassafras (1996, 1999)
 2 - Melmich (2016, 2017)

Most wins by an owner:
 5 - Frank Stronach (1980, 1981, 1984, 1989, 2003)

Most wins by a jockey:
 5 - Todd Kabel (1994, 1997, 2003, 2004, 2007)

Most wins by a trainer:
 4 - Mark Casse (2009, 2013, 2014, 2022)
 4 - Roger L. Attfield (1995, 2001, 2003, 2011)
 3 - Lou Cavalaris, Jr. (1964, 1966, 1975)
 3 - Barbara Minshall (1996, 1998, 1999)

Winners of the Dominion Day Stakes since 1979

Earlier winners 

1978 - Giboulee
1977 - Coverack
1976 - Big Destiny
1975 - Double Quill
1974 - Selari Spirit
1973 - Nice Dancer
1972 - Kennedy Road
1971 - Dance Act
1970 - Amber Orbit
1969 - Bye and Near
1968 - Bye and Near
1968 - Bright Monarch
1967 - Stevie B. Good
1966 - Victorian Era
1965 - E.Day
1964 - Vindent de Paul
1963 - Decidedly
1962 - Wise Command
1961 - Mooney
1960 - Anita's Son
1959 - Biscayne
1958 - Marshal Ney
1957 - Grand Canyon
1956 - Ace Marine
1955 - Sampan
1954 - Chain Reaction
1953 - Mr. Willie

See also
 List of Canadian flat horse races

References

External links
Woodbine's official site

Graded stakes races in Canada
Open middle distance horse races
Woodbine Racetrack
Recurring sporting events established in 1953
1953 establishments in Ontario